Damien Broothaerts (born 13 March 1983 in Uccle) is a Belgian athlete specialising in the sprint hurdles. He represented his country at the 2009 World Championships and 2010 World Indoor Championships.

Apart from hurdling he is a modest sprinter, having won several national titles in the 60 metres and 100 metres events.

On 23 August 2011, he tested positive for an illegal substance, methylhexanamine, and additionally missed three random doping tests within 18 months. For these infringements he was suspended for two years. However, after his appeal his ban was reduced and he was able to compete again since 16 March 2012.

Competition record

Personal bests
Outdoor
100 metres – 10.46 (+0.6 m/s) (Oordegem-Lede 2008)
200 metres – 21.09 (+1.1 m/s) (Brussels 2004)
110 metres hurdles – 13.62 (+1.9 m/s) (Heusden-Zolder 2009)
Indoor
60 metres – 6.76 (Ghent 2009)
60 metres hurdles – 7.68 (Ghent 2015)

References

1983 births
Living people
People from Uccle
Belgian male hurdlers
Belgian male sprinters
Doping cases in athletics
Belgian sportspeople in doping cases
Sportspeople from Brussels